Cloverdale Mall is a community shopping centre located in the Etobicoke area of Toronto, Ontario, Canada, at 250 The East Mall northeast of the intersection of Dundas Street West and Highway 427). It opened in 1956 as an open-air shopping plaza on what was part of the Eatonville farm.

History

In 1956, Cloverdale Mall opened with two major anchors: Dominion and Morgan's. The centre of the plaza was an open-air concrete courtyard. In the 1960s, following the purchase of Morgan's by the Hudson's Bay Company, the Morgan's store was converted into The Bay. In the 1980s, Cloverdale Mall was converted into an enclosed mall and expanded.

In 2005, Hudson's Bay Company replaced The Bay department store with their discount store Zellers at the mall's north end. Zellers expanded the lower/main level retail floor space but did not continue using the upper level of the Bay's former space, and it has been closed ever since.  Winners and Kitchen Stuff Plus opened where the old Zellers outlet was at the mall's southern end. The mall underwent major renovations in 2006. In late 2008, the Dominion store was rebranded as Metro.

In September 2012, the Zellers store closed as its lease was sold to Target. Target opened on the bottom floor of the old store in March 2013. On January 15, 2015, Target announced it was withdrawing from the Canadian market and all its stores would be closed within 4–5 months. The Cloverdale store remains vacant.

QuadReal, the property owner, has proposed replacing the existing mall with a mixed-use development covering 32 acres, while retaining the Cloverdale Mall name. QuadReal plans to submit the rezoning application in March 2020.

In February 2021, it was announced a site at the mall is being prepared as a large-scale clinic for distribution of the COVID-19 vaccine during the COVID-19 pandemic in Toronto.

References

External links

Etobicoke
Shopping malls in Toronto
Shopping malls established in 1956